Nippy's is a drink manufacturer in South Australia. The company is 100% owned by a South Australian family with all of its products being made in Australia. The company produces Fruit Juices, Flavoured Milks and UHT Milk.

Following a salmonella outbreak in 2003 the company was awarded 3 million in damages after they were supplied with infected oranges.

In 2011, the company commenced only using Australian grown oranges in its products for the first time since 2006.

In 2016, the company announced it intended to expand its operations in the Riverland region. The $967,000 expansion was made possible with a 400,000 grant from the Federal government.

The company completed an 10 million plant in 2017 to produce  flavoured milk bottles in addition to the existing range of  flavoured milk boxes.

In 2021, the company announced they intended to remove voluntary health rating logos from their products after the fruit juice range rating changed from 5 stars to two stars following a review by the Australian and New Zealand Ministerial Forum on Food Regulation.

See also

List of juices
List of South Australian manufacturing businesses

References

External links

Drink companies of Australia
Juice brands
Companies based in South Australia
Family-owned companies of Australia
Brand name dairy products
Dairy products companies of Australia
Flavored milk